Barry H. Corey (born November 28, 1961) is the eighth and current president of Biola University, located in Southern California. Corey became Biola's president on July 1, 2007, succeeding Clyde Cook, who retired after serving as Biola's president for 25 years.

Early life
Corey was born on November 28, 1961, in Massachusetts. Corey received a B.A. in English and biblical studies from Evangel University in Springfield, Missouri, in 1984. In 1988, he received an M.A. in American Studies with a concentration in literature and religious history from Boston College. Corey received a Ph.D. from Boston College in curriculum, instruction and administration (a higher education program) in 1992.

Career
Corey served as the vice president for development at Gordon-Conwell Theological Seminary in South Hamilton, Massachusetts, where he led all external relations and fundraising programs including a $54 million capital campaign. He subsequently served as its vice president/chief academic officer, and academic dean.

An ordained minister, Corey served from 1993 to 2000 as pastor of The Greek Evangelical Church of Boston’s English congregation.  When Corey was appointed president of Biola in 2007, he was the first president to come from outside the staff ranks of the university.

Personal life
With his wife Paula, Corey has three children: Anders, Ella and Samuel. He has completed two Boston Marathons, one in 2004 and one in 2006.

Works

References

1961 births
Living people
People from Quincy, Massachusetts
Evangel University alumni
Morrissey College of Arts & Sciences alumni
Gordon–Conwell Theological Seminary faculty
Biola University faculty
American clergy
Seminary presidents